The Association of Contact Lens Manufacturers is a British trade association established in 1962. It claims to represent the manufacturers of over 95% of all prescription contact lenses and lens care products in the UK, and is one of the five representative bodies that make up the Optical Confederation.

The Association produced a rather pessimistic report on report into the state of the contact lens industry in 2015.

It has offices in Devizes, Wiltshire.

References

External links
 

Devizes
Eye care in the United Kingdom
Health in Wiltshire
Trade associations based in the United Kingdom
Organisations based in Wiltshire